Glenn Klinton Spilsbury (born March 4, 1950) is an American former actor. His sole major acting credit is the film The Legend of the Lone Ranger (1981), in which he played the title role.

Biography
Spilsbury, descended from Latter-Day Saint (LDS) settlers in Mexico, spent much of his childhood in Arizona, where his father was a high school and college football coach. The family eventually returned to Mexico, settling in Colonia Juárez. Spilsbury briefly attended Brigham Young University before moving to Hollywood to attempt to break into acting, and in 1979, using the name Max Keller, moved to New York City, where he landed minor parts on daytime soap operas.

He already had appeared in two TV series in 1978 as Max Keller : Suddenly Love as a male student, and Lou Grant as John Gilroy (1 episode).

The Legend of the Lone Ranger
Klinton Spilsbury's dialogue in The Legend of the Lone Ranger was dubbed by actor James Keach. Considerable controversy surrounded Spilsbury at the time of the film's release, in part because of the studio's treatment of Clayton Moore, star of the popular 1950s TV series, who was prevented through legal action from wearing his black mask during personal appearances. It was the only film Spilsbury made. For his performance in this film, Spilsbury received the 1981 Golden Raspberry Award for Worst Actor.

Andy Warhol interviewed Spilsbury during his promotion tour, later describing the interview as "nutty," because Spilsbury was "blowing his whole image" during their conversation. Spilsbury told Warhol that, before making the movie, he had been an art student married to a rich woman and that they had a baby together. He went on to state she had left him because he needed too much time with his own thoughts, a detail that Warhol found amusing. Spilsbury told Warhol that he was a friend of actor Dennis Christopher and had fallen in love with him, and that he also had later fallen in love with actor Bud Cort. Warhol described Spilsbury as "very drunk" during the latter part of the interview, and the latter also mentioned that "he'd been picked up by Halston and woke up in bed with Halston."

Post-Ranger career
A 1989 article in the Los Angeles Times revealed that he had spent some time in Europe and was working as a model. He had hopes to revive his career as an actor, but admitted in the article that he was not having much luck. He has intermittently coached acting workshops at the Herpolscheimer Academy in Vancouver.

In 2013, when the reboot film The Lone Ranger starring Johnny Depp and Armie Hammer was released, Spilsbury was sought out by media sources but declined to comment. According to Variety, Spilsbury was working as a photographer in Los Angeles at the time.

References

External links

1951 births
Living people
American male film actors
American photographers
Brigham Young University alumni
Male models from Arizona
Mexican emigrants to the United States
People from Chihuahua City
People from Flagstaff, Arizona